Quarndon is a civil parish in the Amber Valley district of Derbyshire, England. The parish contains ten listed buildings that are recorded in the National Heritage List for England. Of these, one is listed at Grade II*, the middle of the three grades, and the others are at Grade II, the lowest grade.  The parish contains the village of Quarndon and the surrounding countryside.  The listed buildings consist of the remains of a former church, a current church and items in the churchyard, a hotel, an iron screen, a barn, houses, a well house and a milepost.


Key

Buildings

References

Citations

Sources

 

Lists of listed buildings in Derbyshire